Garmanovo is a rural locality (a village) in Shelotskoye Rural Settlement, Verkhovazhsky District, Vologda Oblast, Russia. The population was 20 as of 2002.

Geography 
Garmanovo is located 60 km southwest of Verkhovazhye (the district's administrative centre) by road. Gorka-Nazarovskaya is the nearest rural locality.

References 

Rural localities in Verkhovazhsky District